The 2007 Bank of Ireland All-Ireland Senior Football Championship, was a Gaelic football competition in Ireland, and was the most significant and prestigious competition in the sport held that year. It began on 13 May 2007, with the final game took place for Sunday, 16 September. Kerry were the defending champions, as well as the most successful team in the competition. Donegal entered the Championship as the unbeaten National League champions, as well as having been runners-up to Tyrone in the 2007 Dr. McKenna Cup.

The draw for the provincial championships took place on 4 November 2006.

Kerry retained their championship, the first team to do so since Cork won back-to-back titles in 1989 and 1990. The final was the first occasion when two teams from Munster, Kerry and Cork, competed, although not the first with two teams from the same Province.  That distinction belongs to the 2003 Championship where two counties from Ulster competed. The final score was Kerry 3-13 Cork 1-09.

Cork's James Masters was the top scorer, with 3 goals and 30 points (3-30: a total of 39 points). He also held the record for the highest individual tally in a match, getting 2-07 (13) in the game against Tipperary.

Results

Munster Senior Football Championship
Players names followed by a number indicates their scoring tally. f=free kick, '45'=45m kick, sline=sideline ball, p=goal scored from penalty. SO=Sent Off

Quarter-finals

Semi-finals

Final

Top scorer: J Masters (Cork) 3-18

Leinster Senior Football Championship

Round 1

Quarter-finals

Semi-finals

Final

Top scorer: M Vaughan (Dublin) 1-17

Ulster Senior Football Championship

Round 1

Quarter-finals

Semi-finals

Final

Top scorer: T Freeman (Monaghan) 1-15

Connacht Senior Football Championship

Quarter-finals

Semi-finals

Final

Top Scorer: M Breheny (Sligo) 0-15

All-Ireland qualifiers
The first round of the qualifying rounds / 'back door system' includes all the counties that did not qualify for their respective provincial final with the exceptions of Antrim, Carlow, Clare, London, Offaly, Tipperary, Waterford and Wicklow. These eight teams played in the Tommy Murphy Cup because these particular teams all played in Division 4 of the 2008 National Football League.

Round 1
An open draw for the first round took place on 24 June, after all but one of the participants were known. This made sure that some teams did not have the advantage of knowing who they are going to be playing against longer than others. The matches were scheduled to be played on the weekend of 7 July and 8.

The eight winning teams from the first round went into another open draw for the second round leaving four teams who then went on to play the four losing teams from the respective provincial finals in the third and final round of qualifiers. The four winning teams from the third round were drawn against one of the four provincial winners in the All-Ireland quarter-finals.

The first round fixture that was most hotly anticipated is the all-Ulster clash of Derry and Armagh.

Round 2
The draw for the second qualifying round took place on 8 July, after the first round results had all been settled. The most anticipated pairing was that of Mayo and Derry. Derry won that game, having already upset Armagh the previous week.

Round 3
The draw for the third round took place on 14 July, and it included the runners up of the provincial championships, each of whom was drawn to play one of the four successful teams from the second round.

All-Ireland series
This stage of the competition is a pure knockout, with teams competing facing off in a single match. As many replays as it takes determines who proceeds in the competition, as at the time there was no definitive tie-breaker in use in Gaelic Games.

The draw for the quarter finals took place on Sunday 29 July, and it involved the four winning teams from Round Three of the qualifier series being drawn against the four provincial winners; Tyrone, Sligo, Kerry and Dublin.

Quarter-finals

Semi-finals

Final

Championship statistics

Miscellaneous

 Waterford win their first Munster championship game since 1988.
 Sligo won their first Connacht title since 1975.
 Monaghan reach the Ulster final for the first time since 1988.

Top scorers

Individual feats

References